Cornelia Klier ( Bügel; born 19 March 1957 in Leutenberg) is a German rower. She married in 1980 prior to attending the Olympic Games and used her married name in Moscow.

References 

 

1957 births
Living people
East German female rowers
Rowers at the 1980 Summer Olympics
Olympic gold medalists for East Germany
Olympic rowers of East Germany
Olympic medalists in rowing
World Rowing Championships medalists for East Germany
Medalists at the 1980 Summer Olympics